Margaret Gardiner may refer to:

 Margaret Gardiner (art collector) (1904–2005), British patron of artists and political activist
 Margaret Gardiner (Miss Universe) (born 1959), South African beauty queen

See also
Margaret Gardner (disambiguation)